The Ven. Francis William Thomas Elliott  was Archdeacon of Berbice from 1908 until 1911. The post then remained vacant for 27 years.

Elliott was educated at St Augustine's College, Canterbury and ordained in 1877. After a curacy at All Saints, Berbice he held incumbencies at Buxton, Demerara and Berbice. On his return from British Guiana he was Chaplain at St Marylebone Hospital.

References

19th-century Guyanese Anglican priests
20th-century Guyanese Anglican priests
Archdeacons of Berbice